This page covers all the important events in the sport of tennis in 2000. Primarily, it provides the results of notable tournaments throughout the year on both the ATP and WTA Tours, the Davis Cup, and the Fed Cup.

ITF

Grand Slam events

Australian Open

Men's singles:  Andre Agassi defeated  Yevgeny Kafelnikov, 3–6, 6–3, 6–2, 6–4
Men's doubles:  Ellis Ferreira /  Rick Leach defeated  Wayne Black /  Andrew Kratzmann, 6–4, 3–6, 6–3, 3–6, 18–16
Women's singles:  Lindsay Davenport defeated  Martina Hingis, 6–1, 7–5
Women's doubles:  Lisa Raymond /  Rennae Stubbs defeated  Martina Hingis /  Mary Pierce, 6–4, 5–7, 6–4
Mixed doubles:  Rennae Stubbs /  Jared Palmer defeated  Arantxa Sánchez Vicario /  Todd Woodbridge, 7–5, 7–6(7–3)

French Open

Men's singles:  Gustavo Kuerten defeated  Magnus Norman, 6–2, 6–3, 2–6, 7–6(8–6)
Men's doubles:  Todd Woodbridge /  Mark Woodforde defeated  Paul Haarhuis /  Sandon Stolle, 7–6, 6–4
Women's singles:  Mary Pierce defeated  Conchita Martínez, 6–2, 7–5
Women's doubles:  Martina Hingis /  Mary Pierce defeated  Virginia Ruano Pascual /  Paola Suárez, 6–2, 6–4
Mixed doubles:  Mariaan de Swardt /  David Adams defeated  Rennae Stubbs /  Todd Woodbridge, 6–3, 3–6, 6–3

Wimbledon

Men's singles:  Pete Sampras defeated  Patrick Rafter, 6–7(10–12), 7–6(7–5), 6–4, 6–2
Men's doubles:  Todd Woodbridge /  Mark Woodforde defeated  Paul Haarhuis /  Sandon Stolle, 6–3, 6–4, 6–1
Women's singles:  Venus Williams defeated  Lindsay Davenport, 6–3, 7–6(7–3)
Women's doubles:  Serena Williams /  Venus Williams defeated  Julie Halard-Decugis /  Ai Sugiyama, 6–3, 6–2
Mixed doubles:  Kimberly Po /  Donald Johnson defeated  Kim Clijsters /  Lleyton Hewitt, 6–4, 7–6(7–3)

US Open

Men's singles:  Marat Safin defeated  Pete Sampras, 6–4, 6–3, 6–3
Men's doubles:  Lleyton Hewitt /  Max Mirnyi defeated  Ellis Ferreira /  Rick Leach, 6–4, 5–7, 7–6
Women's singles:  Venus Williams defeated  Lindsay Davenport, 6–4, 7–5
Women's doubles:  Julie Halard-Decugis /  Ai Sugiyama defeated  Cara Black /  Elena Likhovtseva, 6–0, 1–6, 6–1
Mixed doubles:  Arantxa Sánchez Vicario /  Jared Palmer defeated  Anna Kournikova /  Max Mirnyi, 6–4, 6–3

Summer Olympics

Men's singles:  Yevgeny Kafelnikov defeated  Tommy Haas, 7–6(7–4), 3–6, 6–2, 4–6, 6–3
Women's singles:  Venus Williams defeated  Elena Dementieva, 6–2, 6–4
Men's doubles:  Sébastien Lareau / Daniel Nestor defeated  Todd Woodbridge / Mark Woodforde, 5–7, 6–3, 6–4, 7–6(7–2)
World doubles:  Serena Williams /  Venus Williams defeated  Kristie Boogert /  Miriam Oremans, 6–1, 6–1

ATP Tour

Tennis Masters Cup

Singles:  Gustavo Kuerten defeated  Andre Agassi, 6–4, 6–4, 6–4
Doubles:  Donald Johnson /  Piet Norval defeated  Mahesh Bhupathi /  Leander Paes, 7–6(10–8), 6–3, 6–4

Tennis Masters Series

Indian Wells

Singles:  Àlex Corretja defeated  Thomas Enqvist, 6–4, 6–4, 6–3
Doubles:  Alex O'Brien /  Jared Palmer defeated  Paul Haarhuis /  Sandon Stolle, 6–4, 7–6(7–5)

Key Biscane

Singles:  Pete Sampras defeated  Gustavo Kuerten, 6–1, 6–7(2–7), 7–6(7–5), 7–6(10–8)
Doubles:  Todd Woodbridge /  Mark Woodforde defeated  Martin Damm /  Dominik Hrbatý, 6–3, 6–4

Monte Carlo

Singles:  Cédric Pioline defeated  Dominik Hrbatý, 6–4, 7–6(7–3), 7–6(8–6)
Doubles:  Wayne Ferreira /  Yevgeny Kafelnikov defeated  Paul Haarhuis /  Sandon Stolle, 6–3, 2–6, 6–1

Rome

Singles:  Magnus Norman defeated  Gustavo Kuerten, 6–3, 4–6, 6–4, 6–4
Doubles:  Martin Damm /  Dominik Hrbatý defeated  Wayne Ferreira /  Yevgeny Kafelnikov 6–4, 3–6, 6–4

Hamburg

Singles:  Gustavo Kuerten defeated  Marat Safin, 6–4, 5–7, 6–4, 5–7, 7–6(7–3)
Doubles:  Todd Woodbridge /  Mark Woodforde defeated  Wayne Arthurs /  Sandon Stolle, 6–7, 6–4, 6–3

Canada (Toronto)

Singles:  Marat Safin defeated  Harel Levy, 6–2, 6–3
Doubles:  Sébastien Lareau /  Daniel Nestor defeated  Joshua Eagle /  Andrew Florent, 6–3, 7–6(7–3)

Cincinnati

Singles:  Thomas Enqvist defeated  Tim Henman, 7–6(7–5), 6–4
Doubles:  Mark Woodforde /  Todd Woodbridge defeated  Ellis Ferreira /  Rick Leach, 7–6(8–6), 6–4

Stuttgart

Singles:  Wayne Ferreira defeated  Lleyton Hewitt, 7–6(8–6), 3–6, 6–7(5–7), 7–6(7–2), 6–2
Doubles:  Jiří Novák /  David Rikl defeated  Donald Johnson /  Piet Norval, 3–6, 6–3, 6–4

Paris

Singles:  Marat Safin defeated  Yevgeny Kafelnikov, 3–6, 7–6(9–7), 6–4, 3–6, 7–6(10–8)
Doubles:  Nicklas Kulti /  Max Mirnyi defeated  Paul Haarhuis /  Daniel Nestor, 6–4, 7–5

WTA Tour

WTA Tour Championships

Singles:  Martina Hingis defeated  Monica Seles, 6–7(5–7), 6–4, 6–4
Doubles:  Martina Hingis /  Anna Kournikova defeated  Nicole Arendt /  Manon Bollegraf, 6–2, 6–3

Tier I events
Tokyo

Singles:  Martina Hingis defeated  Sandrine Testud, 6–3, 7–5 
Doubles:  Martina Hingis /  Mary Pierce defeated  Alexandra Fusai /  Nathalie Tauziat, 6–4, 6–1

Indian Wells

Singles:  Lindsay Davenport defeated  Martina Hingis, 4–6, 6–4, 6–0 
Doubles:  Lindsay Davenport /  Corina Morariu defeated  Anna Kournikova /  Natasha Zvereva, 6–2, 6–3

Miami

Singles:  Martina Hingis defeated  Lindsay Davenport, 6–3, 6–2
Doubles:  Julie Halard-Decugis /  Ai Sugiyama defeated  Nicole Arendt /  Manon Bollegraf 4–6, 7–5, 6–4

Hilton Head

Singles:  Mary Pierce defeated  Arantxa Sánchez Vicario, 6–1, 6–0
Doubles:  Virginia Ruano /  Paola Suárez defeated  Conchita Martínez /  Patricia Tarabini, 7–5, 6–3

Berlin

Singles:  Conchita Martínez defeated  Amanda Coetzer, 6–1, 6–2 
Doubles: 

Rome

Singles:  Monica Seles defeated  Amélie Mauresmo, 6–2, 7–6(7–4)
Doubles:  Lisa Raymond /  Rennae Stubbs defeated  Arantxa Sánchez Vicario /  Magüi Serna, 6–3, 4–6, 6–2

Canada (Montréal)

Singles:  Martina Hingis defeated  Serena Williams, 0–6, 6–3, 3–0, retired
Doubles:  Martina Hingis /  Nathalie Tauziat defeated  Julie Halard-Decugis /  Ai Sugiyama, 6–3, 3–6, 6–4

Zurich

Singles:  Martina Hingis defeated  Lindsay Davenport, 6–4, 4–6, 7–5
Doubles:  Martina Hingis /  Anna Kournikova defeated  Kimberly Po /  Anne-Gaëlle Sidot, 6–3, 6–4

Moscow

Singles:  Martina Hingis defeated  Anna Kournikova, 6–3, 6–1
Doubles:  Julie Halard-Decugis /  Ai Sugiyama defeated  Martina Hingis /  Anna Kournikova, 4–6, 6–4, 7–6(5)

International Tennis Hall of Fame
Class of 2000:
Mal Anderson, player
Martina Navratilova, player
Robert J. Kelleher, contributor

 
Tennis by year